Eduardo Alejandro Chirinos Arrieta (4 April 1960 – 17 February 2016) was a Peruvian professor of literature at the University of Montana, and a poet. He received the Premio Casa de América de Poesía Americana in 2001.

Career 

Eduardo Chirinos was born in Lima, in 1960. He studied Hispanic linguistics, acquiring a bachelor's degree from Pontificia Universidad Católica del Perú, and a PhD in literature at Rutgers University.

He was a professor in the department of Modern and Classical Languages and Literatures at the University of Montana, specializing in Latin American Literature, Modernism, Avant-Garde, Spanish and Latin American Contemporary Poetry.

References

External links 
 Libros peruanos

1960 births
2016 deaths
Peruvian male poets
University of Montana faculty
Peruvian anthologists